Star Show 360 was a South Korean variety television show on MBC Every1, which aired Monday at 5:30 PM KST with a rerun at 11:10 PM KST. The show was hosted by Leeteuk, Tak Jae-hoon and Kim So-hye an I.O.I Member

2016

References 

South Korean variety television shows
Korean-language television shows
2016 South Korean television series debuts